Penayo is a surname. Notable people with the surname include:

 Gilberto Penayo (1933–2020), Paraguayan footballer
 Gloria Penayo (born 1962), former First Lady of Paraguay 
 Pedro Wilfrido Garay Penayo (born 1982), Paraguayan long-distance runner